Royal Air Force Station Wigsley, also known as RAF Wigsley, is a former Royal Air Force station located  east of Tuxford, Nottinghamshire and  west of Lincoln, Lincolnshire, England.

History

 No.14 (Pilots) Advanced Flying Unit.
 No. 28 Aircrew Holding Unit.
 No 201 Advanced Flying School.
 No 204 Advanced Flying School.
 No. 455 Squadron RAF with the Handley Page Hampden.
 No. 1654 Heavy Conversion Unit RAF.

Current use
The site is now used as farmland.

See also
 List of former Royal Air Force stations

References

Citations

Bibliography

External links

1941 establishments in England
Royal Air Force stations of World War II in the United Kingdom